The Belmont Correctional Institution (BeCI) is a state prison for men located in St. Clairsville, Belmont County, Ohio, owned and operated by the Ohio Department of Rehabilitation and Correction.  The facility was opened in 1995, and houses a maximum of 2713 inmates at a mix of minimum and medium security levels.

References

Prisons in Ohio
Buildings and structures in Belmont County, Ohio
1995 establishments in Ohio